The 1896–97 season was the twelfth since the foundation of Southampton St. Mary's F.C. and their third in league football, as members of the Southern League. The season was the most successful yet, with St. Mary's claiming the Southern League title for the first time and reaching the Second Round Proper of the FA Cup. It was the start of the most successful period in the club's history — in a period of eight years, they were Southern League champions six times and reached the final of the FA Cup twice.

Pre-season
Following the closure of the Antelope Ground in April 1896, St. Mary's were forced to look for a new home. Thanks to the connections of their president Dr. H. W. R. Bencraft, who was also Hon. Secretary to Hampshire County Cricket Club, the club secured the use of The County Ground, at an annual rental of £200.

As St. Mary's were unrestricted by the maximum wages rule of the Football League they were able to "poach" players from League clubs by offering them higher pay. During the close-season, the Saints' committee signed several players  who were keen to earn more money in the Southern League. Amongst the recruits were Robert Buchanan from Woolwich Arsenal and Harry Haynes from Small Heath, but the most significant signing was goalkeeper George Clawley who was signed from Stoke and began a long and illustrious career with the Saints.

Charles Robson resigned as secretary and was replaced by Alfred McMinn with Bill Dawson continuing as trainer and Ernest Arnfield becoming Assistant Secretary. The team kit was changed from red and white halves to red and white striped shirts with blue shorts; this basic design was to remain unchanged until the 1970s.

League season
The 1896–97 season was the Saints' third in the Southern League, having finished in third place in each of the previous two seasons. The team started the league season with a run of nine consecutive victories, including  defeating Sheppey United 6–1, New Brompton 8–3 and Reading 6–0 (all at home). From the New Year onwards, results were less predictable with the season often interrupted by the weather and the demands of the FA Cup, but the team remained undefeated throughout the league season finishing as champions, four points ahead of the defending champions, Millwall Athletic.

The championship was secured only in the penultimate match of the season on 14 April, a 2–1 victory over bottom club, Wolverton, with the two points earned putting St. Mary's out of the reach of their nearest rivals, Millwall. When the team returned by train to Southampton, they were greeted by a crowd, estimated at up to 15,000, at the Docks station accompanied by the police band.The train was late and the crowd increased. When the team stepped on the platform the "Southampton whisper" (a shout, with great vigour, of "Yi! Yi! Yi!") gained such volume that it almost raised the station roof. The team were then put into wagons and, with the band playing, were led by the crowd through the town to Kingsland Square where, after the band played the National Anthem, the crowd eventually dispersed.

The final match of the season was at the County Ground, against Millwall Athletic; Saints were anxious to maintain their unbeaten record and Millwall, who had gone through the 1894-95 season unbeaten, were equally keen to prevent the Saints from emulating that achievement. Millwall scored first early in the match, but Southampton fought back to equalise with a "brilliant shot" from Joe Turner following one of his "mesmerising dashes down the wing".

As team captain, Farrell received the Championship shield from Dr. Russell Bencraft, who was both president of the League and of the club, at a ceremony in the Artillery Drill Hall in Southampton. Each player received a gold medal, with mementoes also being presented to trainer Dawson and his assistant, Joyce.

League results

Legend

Top of league table

FA Cup
As the Saints had reached the First Round Proper in each of the previous two seasons, the FA exempted them from the first of the four qualifying rounds of the FA Cup.

In the Second Qualifying Round, St. Mary's were drawn away to their local rivals, Cowes. Several thousand travelled to the Isle of Wight to see the "Saints" comprehensively outplay Cowes, with Robert Buchanan, Jack Farrell and Joe Turner each scoring twice in a 6–0 victory. St. Mary's had to travel again in the next round, to visit Elm Park; on arriving at the stadium, the team found the pitch waterlogged. McMinn lodged a protest with the referee, who declared the pitch playable so the match went ahead with the Saints winning 4–1. As had happened several times before with matches between the two clubs, Reading protested to the FA who declared that the result should stand.

The next round brought a home tie against Swindon Town; despite Swindon scoring first, the Saints then ran riot with eight goals, with Farrell scoring a hat-trick. This put Southampton through to the First Round Proper for the third consecutive season, where they met Derbyshire club, Heanor Town. After a draw at the County Ground, the teams met in a replay on the following Wednesday. Heanor lost their winger, Hardy, with a broken leg and the Saints went through with a single goal from Farrell. Following the match, The Southern Daily Echo set up a fund for Hardy which raised £40.

In the Second Round, the Saints met Football League opposition with a tie against Newton Heath. A crowd of 8,000 saw St. Mary's hold their opponents to a 1–1 draw at the County Ground. Willie Naughton was injured for the replay and was replaced by James Spellacy, who was making his only first-team appearance; Naughton was badly missed and the Saints went out of the cup to goals from Bryant and Cassidy.

Friendly matches
With only ten home league matches in the season and the poor weather since Christmas, the Saints' committee organised several friendly matches in order to boost the club's finances. Over the whole season, the team played in excess of thirty friendly matches with a heavy programme of fixtures over Easter and up to the end of April, including several matches against opposition from the Football League.

On 22 March, they entertained a team for Sheffield Wednesday, who had defeated them in the previous season's FA Cup. This time, the Saints were victorious, by four goals to one. There were also victories over Darwen (2–0), Blackburn Rovers (4–1) and Derby County (7–3) with only Woolwich Arsenal winning, with a 5–1 scoreline.

Merger proposals
At this time, the only other local professional football club was Freemantle, who had ended the 1896–97 season in a crisis, having been denied promotion to the Southern League First Division after they had used a player whose transfer had not been registered. As a result, the club was thrown into turmoil with both the treasurer and secretary resigning. At Freemantle's 1897 A.G.M. it was revealed that the club was in debt by over £200, and plans to incorporate the club into a limited company were abandoned.

At St. Mary's meanwhile, a sub-committee had been established to look into playing arrangements for the 1897–98 season, as the cost of hiring the County Ground from the Cricket club was prohibitive. The sub-committee's main brief was to negotiate terms for a further season at the County Ground, but it was also proposed that "enquiries be made as to the Freemantle ground".

At the Freemantle AGM on 21 May, the chairman produced a pamphlet proposing a merger with St. Mary's; although some club members objected to the proposal being discussed in the absence of the club president, Tankerville Chamberlayne (Member of Parliament for Southampton), it was agreed to meet with St. Mary's to discuss the proposals. The idea of a merger between the two clubs had attractions, especially as the rent on Freemantle's ground at Shirley was only £24 p.a. compared to £200 at the County Ground. Although delegations from both sides met to discuss the proposals, there was strong opposition and after much deliberation the St Mary's committee decided not to proceed.

On 11 June, the A.G.M. of St. Mary's agreed to reconstitute the club as a limited liability company. The members were also informed that "the committee had a ground in view". The ground, it emerged, was an abandoned, partly excavated, railway cutting known as "the dell".

Limited company
On 8 July 1897, a meeting was held at the Bedford Hotel to agree the structure of the new company, Southampton Football & Athletic Company Limited. The first chairman of the new company was Dr. Ernest Stancomb (medical practitioner), with G.A.E. Hussey (brewer), H.M. Ashton (engineer), George Thomas (fish merchant) and George Payne (butcher) being elected as the first directors. Alfred McMinn was appointed as Hon. Secretary with Ernest Arnfield becoming "financial secretary or treasurer". Dr. Stancomb was charged with making the arrangements for the transfer from "St. Mary's F.C."

At a further meeting at the offices of the club's lawyers on 16 July, arrangements were made for the issue of shares, with Tankerville Chamberlayne being invited on to the board. By the time of the issue of the Memorandum of Association, R.B. Horne (dairyman), W. Newnham (law clerk), Edward Brown (butcher) and Charles Robson (mineral water merchant and wicket-keeper for Hampshire, who had been the St. Mary's club secretary in 1895–96) had been added to the list of directors.

One result of the change to limited company status was that, subject to approval from the Football Association, the club would in future be known as Southampton Football Club.

Player statistics

Key
 GK — Goalkeeper 
 FB — Full back  
 HB — Half back 
 FW — Forward

Notes
 Fred Hayter was a Southampton born player, who was the regular reserve team inside-left. He replaced the injured Watty Keay for two matches in February. He was "capped" at county level.
 George Shenton was an outside-right who made only one first team appearance, at New Brompton on 6 February 1887, in which he scored. He was "capped" at county level.
 James Spellacy was an inside-right who made only one first team appearance, replacing the injured Willie Naughton in the FA Cup replay defeat at Newton Heath on 13 February 1887. He was "capped" at county level and also played for Cowes.

Transfers

In

Departures

References

Bibliography
  

 

Southampton F.C. seasons
Southampton